Bernardo Redín Valverde (born 26 February 1963 in Cali) is a retired Colombian football player. He is the current manager of Cúcuta Deportivo.

Playing career

Club
During the 1980s Bernardo Redin was part of Deportivo Cali's Dinamic Duo with famous football player Carlos "El Pibe" Valderrama.

International
He earned 40 caps and scored 5 goals for the Colombia national football team from 1987 to 1991, and scored 2 goals in the 1990 FIFA World Cup.

Managerial career
After he retired from playing, Redín became a football coach. He has led Atlético Huila, Deportivo Cali, América de Cali, Monagas, The Strongest, Deportivo Pasto, Academia and Atlético Bucaramanga.

As of 2014, Redín became the assistant coach of Atlético Nacional Reinaldo Rueda, as well since 2017 at Flamengo.

References

External links
 
 Bernardo Redin at Footballdatabase

1963 births
Living people
Footballers from Cali
Colombian footballers
Colombia international footballers
1987 Copa América players
1989 Copa América players
1991 Copa América players
1990 FIFA World Cup players
Categoría Primera A players
First Professional Football League (Bulgaria) players
Deportivo Cali footballers
América de Cali footballers
PFC CSKA Sofia players
Oriente Petrolero players
Atlético Huila footballers
Deportes Quindío footballers
Colombian expatriate footballers
Expatriate footballers in Bulgaria
Colombian expatriate sportspeople in Bulgaria
Expatriate footballers in Bolivia
Colombian football managers
Atlético Huila managers
Deportivo Cali managers
América de Cali managers
Academia F.C. managers
Deportivo Pasto managers
Cúcuta Deportivo managers
Expatriate football managers in Chile
Expatriate football managers in Venezuela
Expatriate football managers in Bolivia
Association football midfielders
Monagas S.C. managers